Walchia is a fossil conifer, cypress-like genus found in upper Pennsylvanian (Carboniferous) and lower Permian (about 310-290 Mya) rocks of Europe and North America. A forest of in-situ Walchia tree-stumps is located on the Northumberland Strait coast at Brule, Nova Scotia.

Besides the Walchia forest, fallen tree trunks, and leaflet impressions, the forest, fossil-rich layer contains numerous, 4-legged, tetrapod fossil trackways.

Individual species
W. hypnoides: from the schists of Lodeve; also copper slates of the Zechstein in Mansfeld.

Monuran trackways
At the same time period of 290 mya, another species was making fossil trackways, now preserved in New Mexico; Walchia leaflets are found in the same fossil layers. The Monuran trackways were made by Permian, wingless insects called monurans, (meaning "one-tail"); the insects' means of locomotion was hopping, then walking.

These 290 mya layers contain footprints of the large Dimetrodon, large/small raindrop impact marks, and also these fossil trackways of insects.

References

External links 
General articles
Chemosystematic and microstructural investigations--(including Walchia)
Book preview-(1854)--W. hypnoides discussion

Walchia Fossil examples
Graphic of W. piniformis branchlets, from James D. Dana, "Manual of Geology" 
Photo-High Res; Article – www.news.ucdavis.edu--"A Bumpy Shift from Icehouse to Greenhouse", Fossil from Smithsonian. Walchia went from the 'Uplands' to the lower basins-(floodplain forest region of Brule, Nova Scotia).
Photo-High Res--4 cm width Leaflet-(Order Voltziales); Article – www.colby.edu-"Carboniferous Paleoecological Scenarios"

Walchia fossils, with Monuran trackways
"The Footfalls and Bellyflops of Permian Insects" – (from the Robledo Mountains of New Mexico)

Voltziales
Conifer genera
Prehistoric gymnosperm genera
Carboniferous plants
Permian plants
Fossil trackways
Carboniferous life of Europe
Carboniferous life of North America
Permian life of Europe
Permian life of North America
Paleozoic life of Nova Scotia
Paleozoic life of Nunavut
Paleozoic life of Prince Edward Island
Pennsylvanian plants
Pennsylvanian first appearances
Permian extinctions